The Sri Sridhara Ayyaval Mutt is a Hindu mutt in the village of Thiruvisanallur. The mutt was established by a Saivite saint Sridhara Venkatesa Ayyaval who lived and preached here in the late 17th century. The main duties of the mutt are to perpetuate the memory of Sridhara Ayyaval. The mutt also organizes philanthropic activities and holds pujas during major Hindu festivals.

The mutts in Tamil Nadu started for the purpose of developing Hinduism and serving the public. More are less than they are performing the welfare activities in the society. Constructing a temple in Tamil Nadu (by stone) is so expensive. Likewise maintaining the old temple showing the ancient Tamil Nadu culture and style is also expensive. The mutts are partially taking the service.    

The following Navagraha temples are situated in the districts of Thanjavur Nagappatinam Thiruvarur and Puducheri territory. But the Kumbakonam town is surrounded by all the Navagrasthalam. So we can take  trip from Kumbakonam.

References 
 Website of the Sri Sridhara Ayyaval Mutt

Hindu monasteries in India